Angelo Fagiani (18 April 1943 – 4 July 2020) was an Italian Roman Catholic archbishop.

Fagiani was born in Italy and was ordained to the priesthood in 1967. He served as archbishop of the Roman Catholic Archdiocese of Camerino-San Severino Marche, Italy, from 1999 until 2007.

Notes

1943 births
2020 deaths
Roman Catholic archbishops in Italy
Bishops in le Marche